Qamil Musa Haxhi Feza (?–?) was an Albanian statesman. He became a chairman of the Administrative Commission on 3 September 1914 and held that position for less than a month, as the position was abolished the same month it was established.

References 

Year of death missing
Year of birth missing
Albanian politicians